Ryan Stanton (born July 20, 1989) is a Canadian professional ice hockey defenseman who is currently playing with Kölner Haie in the Deutsche Eishockey Liga (DEL).

Personal life
Stanton was born on July 20, 1989, in St. Albert, Alberta, Canada, to construction superintendent Don and mother Deanne Stanton. His father later joined the scouting staff for the Moose Jaw Warriors.

Playing career

Junior
Prior to turning professional, Stanton played major junior hockey in the Western Hockey League with the Moose Jaw Warriors. Stanton made his debut in the Western Hockey League (WHL) against the Brandon Wheat Kings on March 8, 2006 at the age of 16. He had a streak of six straight games ranging from 10/30/09 to 11/14/09 in which he recorded a point for a total of 11 points. During that streak, Stanton had 3 goals and 8 assists. On December 11, 2009, Stanton recorded four assists to lead his team to an 11–2 win over the Edmonton Oil Kings. He led all Moose Jaw Warriors defenceman in the 2009-10 season with 40 points (10 goals - 30 assists).

Professional
On March 12, 2010, the Chicago Blackhawks signed Stanton as an Undrafted free agent to a three-year entry-level contract. Stanton played for the Blackhawks affiliate, the Rockford Icehogs, of the American Hockey League. He made his debut for the Icehogs on March 6, 2010 against the Houston Aeros with a +1 rating in a 3-1 Rockford victory. His first American Hockey League career point was an assist on March 10, 2010 against the San Antonio Rampage in a 4–2 loss. Stanton's first career professional goal was scored in a 4-3 Icehogs loss on February 23, 2011 against the Chicago Wolves.

For the 2010–11 season, Stanton was named the Icehog's Most Improved Player. In the 2012–13 season, he played in his first NHL game with the Blackhawks on April 27, 2013. The Blackhawks would go on to win the Stanley Cup that season, although Stanton did not qualify to have his name on the Stanley Cup.

Stanton was claimed off of waivers from the Blackhawks by the Vancouver Canucks, before the 2013–14 season on September 30, 2013. Stanton scored his first NHL goal on October 17, 2013 against Ryan Miller of the Buffalo Sabres.

After establishing himself in the NHL in his two seasons with the Canucks, on July 24, 2015, Stanton signed as a free agent to a one-year, two-way contract with the Washington Capitals.

At the conclusion of the season and at the end of his contract with the Capitals he signed a one-year, two-way contract as a free agent to join the Colorado Avalanche. After attending the Avalanche's training camp and participating in pre-season games, Stanton was assigned to the AHL to play with affiliate, the San Antonio Rampage. Stanton made his Rampage and 2016–17 season debut in a 2–1 defeat against the Milwaukee Admirals on October 15, 2016. On November 28, 2016, after 15 games with the Rampage, Stanton was dealt by the Avalanche to the Columbus Blue Jackets in exchange for Cody Goloubef. Stanton was reassigned to the Cleveland Monsters following the trade. He played out the season with the Monsters, appearing in 33 games from the blueline for 8 points.

On July 1, 2017, Stanton signed as a free agent to a two-year, two-way deal with the Edmonton Oilers. On October 31, Stanton was sent to the Oilers' AHL affiliate Bakersfield Condors.

After spending the duration of his contract assigned to the Condors, Stanton left the Oilers as a free agent to sign a one-year contract to continue in the AHL with the Ontario Reign on July 29, 2019. In the 2019–20 season, Stanton was limited to just 36 games through injury with Ontario, collecting 5 points, before the season was ended prematurely due to the COVID-19 pandemic.

On September 16, 2020, Stanton was signed as a free agent to return to former AHL club, the Bakersfield Condors, on a one-year contract.

On August 4, 2021, Stanton extended his AHL career, returning as a free agent to his original club, the Rockford IceHogs, on a one-year contract.

On July 15, 2022, Stanton was signed to his first contract abroad after signing a one-year deal with German club, Kölner Haie of the DEL.

Career statistics

References

External links

1989 births
Living people
Bakersfield Condors players
Canadian ice hockey defencemen
Chicago Blackhawks players
Cleveland Monsters players
Hershey Bears players
Ice hockey people from Alberta
Moose Jaw Warriors players
Ontario Reign (AHL) players
Rockford IceHogs (AHL) players
San Antonio Rampage players
Sportspeople from St. Albert, Alberta
Undrafted National Hockey League players
Vancouver Canucks players
Washington Capitals players